Kenneth Smith (7 December 1927 - 6 December 2018) was an English footballer who played as an inside forward.

Smith started his career with non-league Annfield Plain before signing for Blackpool in April 1949. Without making a first team appearance, Smith moved to Gateshead in August 1952. He scored a total of 79 goals in 269 appearances in league and cup competitions for Gateshead between 1952 and 1959. Smith later played non-League football with Ashington. He died on 6 December 2018 at the age of 90.

Sources

1927 births
English footballers
Association football forwards
Annfield Plain F.C. players
Blackpool F.C. players
Gateshead A.F.C. players
Ashington A.F.C. players
English Football League players
2018 deaths